Events from the year 1797 in Germany.

Incumbents

Holy Roman Empire 
 Francis II (5 July 17926 August 1806)

Important Electors
 Bavaria- Charles I (30 December 1777 – 16 February 1799)
 Saxony- Frederick Augustus I (17 December 176320 December 1806)

Kingdoms 
 Kingdom of Prussia
 Monarch – 
Frederick William II of Prussia (17 August 1786 – 16 November 1797)

Frederick William III of Prussia (16 November 17977 June 1840)

Grand Duchies 
 Grand Duke of Mecklenburg-Schwerin
 Frederick Francis I– (24 April 17851 February 1837)
 Grand Duke of Mecklenburg-Strelitz
 Charles II (2 June 17946 November 1816)
 Grand Duke of Oldenburg
 Wilhelm (6 July 17852 July 1823) Due to mental illness, Wilhelm was duke in name only, with his cousin Peter, Prince-Bishop of Lübeck, acting as regent throughout his entire reign.
 Peter I (2 July 182321 May 1829)
 Grand Duke of Saxe-Weimar
 Karl August  (1758–1809) Raised to grand duchy in 1809

Principalities 
 Schaumburg-Lippe
 George William (13 February 17871860)
 Schwarzburg-Rudolstadt
 Louis Frederick II (13 April 179328 April 1807)
 Schwarzburg-Sondershausen
 Günther Friedrich Karl I (14 October 179419 August 1835)
 Principality of Reuss-Greiz
 Heinrich XI, Prince Reuss of Greiz (12 May 1778-28 June 1800)
 Waldeck and Pyrmont
 Friedrich Karl August  (29 August 176324 September 1812)

Duchies 
 Duke of Anhalt-Dessau
 Leopold III (16 December 17519 August 1817)
 Duke of Saxe-Altenburg
 Duke of Saxe-Hildburghausen (1780–1826)  - Frederick
 Duke of Saxe-Coburg-Saalfeld
 Ernest Frederick, Duke of Saxe-Coburg-Saalfeld (16 September 1764 – 8 September 1800)
 Duke of Saxe-Meiningen
 Georg I (1782–1803)
 Duke of Schleswig-Holstein-Sonderburg-Beck
 Frederick Charles Louis (24 February 177525 March 1816)
 Duke of Württemberg
 Frederick II Eugene, Duke of Württemberg (20 May 1795 – 23 December 1797)
 Frederick I (22 December 179730 October 1816)

Other
 Landgrave of Hesse-Darmstadt
 Louis I (6 April 179014 August 1806)

Events 
26 January – The Treaty of the Third Partition of Poland is signed in St. Petersburg by the Russian Empire, Austria and the Kingdom of Prussia.
12 February – "Gott erhalte Franz den Kaiser" is first performed, with the music composed in January by Joseph Haydn, which also becomes the tune to the Deutschlandlied, the German national anthem (Deutschland, Deutschland über alles, later Einigkeit und Recht und Freiheit).
16 November – The Prussian heir apparent, Frederick William, becomes King of Prussia as Fredrick William III.

Births 

4 January – Wilhelm Beer, German banker, astronomer (d. 1850)
5 January – Eduard Vogel von Falckenstein, Prussian general (d. 1885)
10 January – Annette von Droste-Hülshoff, German writer (d. 1848)
11 January – Carl Rottmann, German landscape painter, the most famous member of the Rottmann family of painters (d. 1850)
26 January – Therese Albertine Luise Robinson, German-American author (d. 1870)
29 January – Prince Adolf zu Hohenlohe-Ingelfingen, Prussian nobleman (d. 1873)
2 February – Bertha Zück, German-born treasurer of Queen Josephine of Sweden (d. 1868)
6 February – Joseph von Radowitz, conservative Prussian statesman, general (d. 1853)
15 February – Henry Engelhard Steinway, German-American piano manufacturer (d. 1871)
23 February – Heinrich Halfeld, German engineer (d. 1873)
3 March – Gotthilf Hagen, German civil engineer who made important contributions to fluid dynamics (d. 1884)
5 March – Friedrich von Gerolt, Prussian Privy Councillor, Envoy Extraordinary and Minister Plenipotentiary in the United States (d. 1879)
21 March – Johann Andreas Wagner, German palaeontologist (d. 1861)
22 March
 Eduard Gans, German jurist (d. 1839)
 Emperor Wilhelm I of Germany (d. 1888)
27 March – Heinrich LXXII, Prince Reuss of Lobenstein and Ebersdorf (d. 1853)
5 April – Karl August Devrient, German stage actor best known for performances of Schiller and Shakespeare (d. 1872)
12 April – Ernst August Hagen, Prussian art writer, novelist (d. 1880)
23 April – Ernst Ferdinand Oehme, German Romantic painter, illustrator (d. 1855)
26 April – Albert Seerig, German surgeon, anatomist (d. 1862)
3 May – Heinrich Berghaus, German geographer (d. 1884)
11 May – Ernst Meyer, German-born Danish genre painter of Jewish ancestry (d. 1861)
12 May – Johann Hermann Kufferath, German composer (d. 1864)
18 May – Frederick Augustus II of Saxony (d. 1854)
30 May
 Johann Christian Lobe, German composer, music theorist (d. 1881)
 Georg Amadeus Carl Friedrich Naumann, German mineralogist (d. 1873)
20 June – Karolina Gerhardinger, German Roman Catholic professed religious, established the School Sisters of Notre Dame  (d. 1879)
12 July – Adele Schopenhauer, German author (d. 1849)
20 July – Gotthard Fritzsche, Prussian-Australian pastor (d. 1863)
25 July – Princess Augusta of Hesse-Kassel (d. 1889)
5 August – Friedrich August Kummer, German violoncellist, pedagogue and composer (d. 1879)
6 August – August Wilhelm Stiehler, German government official, paleobotanist (d. 1878)
7 August – Justin von Linde, German jurist, statesman from the Grand Duchy of Hesse (d. 1870)
9 August – Christian Wilhelm Niedner, German church historian, theologian (d. 1865)
10 August – Joseph Gerhard Zuccarini, German botanist (d. 1848)
28 August – Karl Otfried Müller, German scholar, Philodorian (d. 1840)
10 September – Franz Krüger, German (Prussian) painter, lithographer (d. 1857)
16 September – Johann Friedrich Ludwig Wöhlert, German businessman (d. 1877)
17 September – Heinrich Kuhl, German naturalist, zoologist (d. 1821)
24 September – Carl Peter Wilhelm Gramberg, German theologian, biblical scholar (d. 1830)

3 October – Ludwig Förster, German-born Austrian architect (d. 1863)
10 October – - August Heinrich Hermann von Dönhoff, Prussian diplomat (d. 1874)
15 October
 Johann Gottlieb Fleischer, German botanist and ornithologist (d. 1838)
 Karl Wilhelm Ludwig Heyse, German philologist (d. 1855)
26 October – Johann Adam Philipp Hepp, German physician, lichenologist (d. 1867)
30 October – Princess Henrietta of Nassau-Weilburg (d. 1829)
14 November
 Moses M. Haarbleicher, German-Jewish poet, critic (d. 1869)
 Justus Radius, German pathologist, ophthalmologist (d. 1884)
13 December – Heinrich Heine, German poet (d. 1856)
14 December – Emil Huschke, German anatomist and embryologist (d. 1858)
15 December – Karl Friedrich Theodor Krause, German anatomist (d. 1868)
18 December – August Friedrich Wilhelm Forchhammer, jurist and historian from the Duchy of Schleswig (d. 1870)
26 December – Johann Gustav Heckscher, German politician (d. 1865)

Deaths 
13 January – Elisabeth Christine of Brunswick-Wolfenbüttel-Bevern, queen consort of Prussia (b. 1715)
22 February – Karl Friedrich Hieronymus Freiherr von Münchhausen, German officer and adventurer (b. 1720)
7 March – Johann Heinrich Samuel Formey, German writer (b. 1711)
12 April – Johann Georg Bach, German organist (b. 1751)
12 August – Gotthelf Greiner, glassmaker (born 1732)
4 October – Johann Christian Georg Bodenschatz, German Protestant theologian (born 1717)
6 October – Johann Matthäus Hassencamp, German Orientalist and theologian (born 1743)
16 November – King Frederick William II of Prussia (b. 1744)
27 November – Johann Baptist Wendling, Alsatian-born flute player, composer of the Mannheim School (b. 1723)
23 December – Frederick II Eugene, Duke of Württemberg (b. 1732)

References 

Years of the 18th century in Germany
 
Germany
Germany